Bistritsa is a sparsely inhabited mountainous dispersed village in Blagoevgrad Municipality, in Blagoevgrad Province, Bulgaria. The village consists of 42 neighborhoods. It is situated in Rila mountain 9 kilometers east of Blagoevgrad. The Bistritsa river flows through the village.

History

Оn the territory of today's Bistritsa lived Thracians, before the new era, Romans 1 - 4 century AD, Slavs and Proto-Bulgarians. This is supported by evidence. Some coins minted during the reign of the emperors  ( Tiberius, Claudius, Constans and Constantius II) were found in tnear the village. In addition, during excavations around the former summer camp "Septemvriyche" were found late ancient fortress, church, building bricks, stone balls, iron locks, nails, staples. They are dated to the Thracian-Roman era.

Population

By 1900, according to Vasil Kanchov ("Macedonia. Ethnography and Statistics"), the population of the village numbered 1540 people, of whom 1300 were Bulgarian Christians and 240 Vlachs.

Population according to the censuses over the years:

Economy and transportation

Most of the population is not economically active. There aren't any major economical subjects in the village. There is a municipal asphalt road connecting the village with Blagoevgrad, but most of the neighborhoods are connected with unpaved roads.

Institutions

The only institution in the village is the mayor's office. There aren't any educational or medical institutions. The school is not functioning and its building is ruined.

Religion

There are nine Christian Orthodox churches and chapels in Bistrica. The Church of St. George dates back to 1861, and the Church of St. John the Forerunner in the Dabovo area dates back to 1872. The church of St Demetrius is in the central part of the village and is built also in the end of XIX century.

References

Villages in Blagoevgrad Province